The Principality of Trubetsk (Russian: Трубецкое княжество) was a small, landlocked Rus' principality in Eastern Europe. In the later Middle Ages it was bordered by the Grand Duchy of Lithuania to its west and by Muscovy to its east. The Principality of Trubetsk (Troubchevsk) was a principality within modern Bryansk Oblast, about 50 miles (80 kilometres) southwest of Bryansk.

The Trubetsk (Troubchevsk) town was referred to in the Old East Slavic poem The Tale of Igor's Campaign where, among others, Vsevolod Svyatoslavich, the Prince of Trubetsk and of Kursk, was glorified. In 1185 the Trubetsk army fought against Cumans.

In 1239, after the Mongol invasion of Rus, the Principality of Trubetsk passed to the Princes of Bryansk, and then to the Princes of Trubetsk. In 1566 Ivan IV the Terrible took the principality during the Livonian War. In 1609 Vasili IV of Russia relinquished it to the Polish–Lithuanian Commonwealth during the Polish–Muscovite War (1605–1618). In 1654 Prince Aleksey Trubetskoy on the side of Alexis I of Russia led the southern flank of the Muscovian army from Bryansk to Ukraine. The territory between the Dniepr and Berezyna was overrun, with Aleksey Trubetskoy taking Mstsislaw (Mstislavl) and Roslavl. In 1654 The Principality of Trubetsk was finally conquered by Aleksey Trubetskoy, Prince of Trubetsk himself, as a result of the Russo-Polish War (1654-1667).

1566 disestablishments
Trubetsk, Principality of
Trubetsk, Principality of
Trubetsk
Trubetsk
Medieval Russia